The Pennsylvania Railroad's class A5s was the largest class of 0-4-0 steam locomotives. The Pennsylvania Railroad built 47 in its Juniata Shops between 1916–1924. They were all retired by 1957.  One is preserved at the Railroad Museum of Pennsylvania.

History
In the 1920s, many railroads in the United States had retired 0-4-0 steam locomotives because they were too small for switching duties. This was not the case on the Pennsylvania Railroad (PRR). The PRR was keen on this wheel arrangement due to complex street and tight industrial trackage across its broad network. For some of these lines, the railroad needed a large 0-4-0 to handle the larger switching activities the railroad had. Although the class B was designated for steam locomotives with the 0-6-0 wheel arrangement, these steam locomotives could not fit the tight and complex street, dockyard and industrial trackage the railroad had in its possession.

As early as 1948, the A5s steam locomotives started to be replaced by higher horse powered and heavy duty diesel switchers.  Over the next year, these switchers were gradually replaced by diesel locomotives. Finally in 1957, the Pennsylvania Railroad converted from steam to diesel power and the last of the class was withdrawn.

Preservation
Pennsylvania Railroad number 94 is the only member of its class to be preserved. It is at the Railroad Museum of Pennsylvania in Strasburg, Pennsylvania, across from the Strasburg Rail Road.

Notes

References

External links

Steam locomotives of the United States
A5s
0-4-0 locomotives
Standard gauge locomotives of the United States
Railway locomotives introduced in 1916
Shunting locomotives